Presti is a surname of Italian origin. Notable people with the surname include:

 Ida Presti (1924–1967), French classical guitarist and composer
 José Sérgio Presti, best known as Zé Sérgio (born 1957), Brazilian former football (soccer) player
 Philippe Presti (born 1965), French sailor
 Pino Presti, Italian bassist, arranger, composer, conductor and record producer
 Sam Presti (born c. 1976), American basketball executive
 Simon 'Presti' Prestigiacomo (born 1978), retired Australian rules footballer
 Thaissa Presti (born 1985), Brazilian track and field sprint athlete

Other
 Stadio Vincenzo Presti, multi-use stadium in Gela, Italy

See also
 Lopresti

Italian-language surnames